is a railway station on the Chikuhi Line of Kyushu Railway Company (JR Kyushu), located in Karatsu, Saga Prefecture, Japan.

Lines

Station layout 
The station, which is unstaffed, consists of a side platform serving a single track at grade. There is no station building but a shelter has been set up on the platform. A bike shed is provided nearby.

Adjacent stations

History
Nishi-Ōchi was opened on the same day as an intermediate station on the new track. The Kitakyushi Railway was nationalised on 1 October 1937. Japanese Government Railways (JGR) assumed control of the station and designated the track which served it as part of the Chikuhi Line. With the privatization of Japanese National Railways (JNR), the successor of JGR, on 1 April 1987, control of the station passed to JR Kyushu.

Passenger statistics
In fiscal 2015, there were a total of 3,431 boarding passengers, giving a daily average of 9 passengers.

References

External links
Nishi-Ōchi Station (JR Kyushu)

Railway stations in Saga Prefecture
Stations of Kyushu Railway Company
Chikuhi Line
Railway stations in Japan opened in 1935